One of a Kind may refer to:

Film and television
 One of a Kind (film), a 2013 French film
 One of a Kind (game show), a 1958–1959 Canadian panel show
 One of a Kind (TV series), a 1978 Canadian children's series
 "One of a Kind" (Brandy & Mr. Whiskers), a television episode
 "One of a Kind" (Danny Phantom), a television episode

Music

Albums
 One of a Kind (Bruford album) or the title song, 1979
 One of a Kind (Dave Grusin album), 1977
 One of a Kind (Moe Bandy album) or the title song, 1979
 One of a Kind (Pandora album) or the title song (see below), 1993
 One of a Kind (Tammy Wynette album) or the title song (see below), 1977
 One of a Kind (G-Dragon EP) or the title song (see below), 2012
 One of a Kind (Monsta X EP), 2021
 One of a Kind, by Della Reese, 1978
 One of a Kind, by Orleans, or the title song, 1982

Songs
 "One of a Kind" (G-Dragon song), 2012
 "One of a Kind" (Pandora song), 1994
 "One of a Kind" (Tammy Wynette song), 1977
 "One of a Kind (Love Affair)", by the Spinners, 1973
 "One of a Kind", by Bosson from Rockstar, 2003
 "One of a Kind", by Breaking Point from Coming of Age, 2001

See also
 :Category:One-of-a-kind computers